The Port of Portland Police is a non-Home Office ports police force responsible for the Port of Portland in Dorset, United Kingdom.

History
The force was established in 1997 when the Portland Harbour Authority Ltd. bought the port from the British Government. It is a body of constables attested under section 79 of the Harbours, Docks, and Piers Clauses Act 1847 (as incorporated by Portland Harbour Revision Order 1997). The Port Police staff the main entrance to the Port 24 hours a day, year-round.

Present Day
In February 2018, four new constables were sworn in. In July 2020, the Port Police agreed a memorandum of understanding with the local police force, Dorset Police. This will involve the sharing of assets, improving communication and allowing the collation of information.

Duties
The Port Police guard the main entrance to the Port, 24 hours a day, all-year-round.

The Port Police are responsible for ensuring the security and safety of  the port and its tenants, employees, users and visitors as well as the international ships visiting the port.

The Port of Portland has its own Byelaws (Portland Port General Byelaws 2018) and these are enforced by the Port Police.

Powers
All Port Police officers are sworn in as "special constables" under Section 79 of the Harbours, Docks, and Piers Clauses Act 1847 (HDPCA).
N.B. The act uses the term 'special constable'; at the time this act was passed 'special constable' meant any constable who was not a member of a territorial police force.

As a result, officers have the full powers of a constable on "any land owned by the harbour, dock, or port and at any place within one mile of any owned land".

Uniform
Portland Port Police officers wear a typical UK Port Police uniform.
All officers have a "warrant card" which is used to identify their authority as constables.

Operational Uniform
This uniform is worn for everyday operational police duties and consists of:

Black t-shirt or white shirt & black tie
Black trousers
Black jacket with police markings and rank slide
Black boots
Custodian helmet (males) with Portland Port Police helmet badge.
Peaked cap with black and white checquered cap band and capbadge.

Rank structure
The rank structure of the Portland Port Police force is as follows:

Vehicles
The Portland Port Police use the following vehicles as police vehicles, all vehicles are marked with blue and yellow battenburg marks, blue flashing lights, sirens and Portland Port Police badge:

Land Rover Discovery.

See also
Law enforcement in the United Kingdom
Port police

External links
Official website of the Port of Portland Police

References

Government agencies established in 1997
Police forces of England
Isle of Portland
Port police forces of the United Kingdom